The Boardman Tasker Prize for Mountain Literature is an annual prize of £3,000 awarded by the Boardman Tasker Charitable Trust to an author or authors for "an original work which has made an outstanding contribution to mountain literature".  The prize was established in 1983 in memory of British climbers Peter Boardman and Joe Tasker, both of whom wrote books about their mountaineering expeditions, after their deaths on the northeast ridge of Mount Everest in 1982. It can be awarded for a piece of fiction or non-fiction, poetry or drama, although the work must have been written in (or translated into) English. The prize is announced at the annual Kendal Mountain Festival.

Winners
2022 Brian Hall, High Risk: Climbing to Extinction and Helen Mort, A Line Above the Sky: A Story of Mountains and Motherhood 
2021 David Smart, Emilio Comici: Angel of the Dolomites
2020 Jessica J. Lee, Two Trees Make a Forest: On Memory, Migration and Taiwan
2019 Kate Harris, Lands of Lost Borders: A Journey on the Silk Road
2018 David Roberts, Limits of the Known
2017 Bernadette McDonald, Art of Freedom: The Life and Climbs of Voytek Kurtyka
2016 Simon McCartney, The Bond: Two Epic Climbs in Alaska and a Lifetime's Connection Between Climbers
2015 Barry Blanchard, The Calling: A Life Rocked by Mountains
2014 Jules Lines, Tears of the Dawn
2013 Harriet Tuckey, Everest – The First Ascent: The Untold Story of Griffith Pugh, the Man Who Made It Possible
2012 Andy Kirkpatrick, Cold Wars: Climbing the Fine Line between Risk and Reality
2011 Bernadette McDonald, Freedom Climbers
2010 Ron Fawcett with Ed Douglas, Ron Fawcett, Rock Athlete
2009 Steve House, Beyond the Mountain
2008 Andy Kirkpatrick, Psychovertical
2007 Robert Macfarlane, The Wild Places
2006 Charles Lind, An Afterclap of Fate: Mallory on Everest
2005 Andy Cave, Learning to Breathe
2005 Jim Perrin, The Villain: The Life of Don Whillans
2004 Trevor Braham, When the Alps Cast Their Spell
2003 Simon Mawer, The Fall
2002 Robert Roper, Fatal Mountaineer
2001 Roger Hubank, Hazard's Way
2000 Peter Gillman and Leni Gillman, The Wildest Dream: Mallory – His Life and Conflicting Passions
1999 Paul Pritchard, The Totem Pole: And a Whole New Adventure
1998 Peter Steele, Eric Shipton: Everest and Beyond
1997 Paul Pritchard, Deep Play: A Climber's Odyssey from Llanberis to the Big Walls
1996 Audrey Salkeld, A Portrait of Leni Riefenstahl
1995 Alan Hankinson, Geoffrey Winthrop Young: Poet, Mountaineer, Educator
1994 Dermot Somers, At the Rising of the Moon
1993 Jeff Long, The Ascent
1992 Will McLewin, In Monte Viso's Horizon: Climbing All the Alpine 4000m Peaks
1991 Alison Fell, Mer de Glace
1991 Dave Brown and Ian Mitchell, A View from the Ridge
1990 Victor Saunders, Elusive Summits
1989 M. John Harrison, Climbers
1988 Joe Simpson, Touching the Void
1987 Roger Mear and Robert Swan, In the Footsteps of Scott
1986 Stephen Venables, Painted Mountains: Two Expeditions to Kashmir
1985 Jim Perrin, Menlove: The Life of John Menlove Edwards
1984 Linda Gill, Living High: A Family Trek in the Himalayas
1984 Doug Scott and Alex MacIntyre, The Shishapangma Expedition

Young Writer's Award
In 2012, an award for writers aged between 16 and 25 was introduced for works up to 1,500 words in length that must be "original unpublished literary work, whether fiction, non-fiction, drama or poetry, the central theme of which is concerned with the mountain environment". The prize is £250 and publication in Summit magazine.

See also
Banff Mountain Book Festival
Piolet d'Or

References

External links
Boardman Tasker Prize for Mountain Literature
The Boardman Tasker Legacy by Stephen Venables

Awards established in 1984
1984 establishments in the United Kingdom
Mountaineering awards
 
British non-fiction literary awards
Outdoor literature awards